Carl Malcolm (born July 18, 1946, Black River, St. Elizabeth, Jamaica) is a Jamaican reggae singer and percussionist.

Biography
Malcolm initially learned the keyboard, picking up skills on the instrument at his local Methodist church. He attended St. Elizabeth Technical High School before moving to Kingston, where he worked for a shoe company and was a reservist in the Jamaica Defence Force. In 1965 he joined his first group, The Volcanoes, alongside Al Brown, the pair staying together until 1969. Malcolm then gave up music while he continued his studies, but returned when he joined the group Big Relations, led by Jo Jo Bennett. Malcolm recorded briefly as a solo artist, recording "Father Free Us" for Clement "Coxsone" Dodd's Studio One label, before spending time in the United States. On his return to Jamaica he was employed by Rupie Edwards as the branch manager of the Success Records shop at Half Way Tree. He also began recording again, including the 1973 single "No Jestering", and the follow-up "Miss Wire Waist", which topped the UK reggae chart when it was issued there in 1975. 

He had his greatest success in September 1975 with "Fattie Bum-Bum". This was picked up for release by independent label UK Records after Dave Cash started to play it on his Capital Radio programme, and it quickly got to number 2 on the station's 'Hitline' listeners' chart. It eventually reached number 8 on the UK Singles Chart. It remained in the chart for eight weeks. The track was written by Malcolm and produced by Clive Chin. It had been copied in a cover version by the UK group The Diversions, which also charted (reaching #34), diverting some sales away from Malcolm's version. Although this was Malcolm's only mainstream chart success, he had a hit in the reggae charts in 1977 with "Repatriation", recorded with Ranking Trevor.

More recently Malcolm was the drummer on The Melodians 1992 album, Swing & Dine; on Pat Kelly's 1995 album, Butterflies; and on Glen Brown's 1995 album, The Way to Mt. Zion.

See also
Fatty Boom Boom

References

1952 births
Living people
People from Saint Elizabeth Parish
Jamaican male singers
Jamaican songwriters